Reichenbachiella agariperforans is a bacterium from the genus of Reichenbachiella which has been isolated from seawater near the Amursky Bay by the Pacific Ocean.

References

Further reading

External links
Type strain of Reichenbachiella agariperforans at BacDive -  the Bacterial Diversity Metadatabase	

Cytophagia
Bacteria described in 2003